Beclean is a commune in Brașov County, Transylvania, Romania. It is composed of five villages: Beclean, Boholț, Calbor, Hurez, and Luța.

The commune is located in the western part of the county, in the historic Țara Făgărașului region, on the left bank of the Olt River. The river Săvăstreni discharges into the Olt at Beclean.

References

Communes in Brașov County
Localities in Transylvania